Vespasiano da Bisticci (1421 – 1498) was an Italian humanist and librarian of the early Renaissance period.

Life 
Born near Rignano sull'Arno, not far from Florence, he was chiefly a book merchant, or cartolaio, and had a share in the formation of many great libraries of the time. When Cosimo de' Medici wished to assemble the Laurentian Library of Florence, Vespasiano advised him, and sent him by Tommaso Parentucelli (later Pope Nicholas V) a systematic catalogue, which became the plan of the new collection. In twenty-two months Vespasiano had 200 volumes made for Cosimo by twenty-five copyists. Most of them were, as typical of the era, books of theology and liturgical chant.

He had performed important services for the diffusion of classical authors when Nicholas V, the true founder of the Vatican Library, became pope. He devoted fourteen years to collecting the library of Federico da Montefeltro, the Duke of Urbino, organizing it in a more modern manner; it contained the catalogues of the Vatican, of San Marco, Florence, of the Visconti Library at Pavia, and Oxford.

Vespasiano had a limited knowledge of Latin, and he is one of the few writers of the time who acknowledged it. Untrained as a writer, but with a discernment and intelligence in the appraisal of important figures, he left a collection of 300 biographies that is a major source of shrewd observation and reliable facts for the history of 15th-century humanism: Vite di uomini illustri del secolo XV. He retired in 1480, disheartened by the advance of the printing press that was displacing the beautifully illuminated manuscripts that were his stock in trade and his love.

He was not an erudite philosopher or historian such as Machiavelli and Guicciardini proved to be in the next generation, but he depicts the atmosphere of the period and its intellectual life. His accounts plunge the reader into the social world of Florence; they contain delicate pictures of manners, charming portraits, noble female figures, of which last point it is possible to judge by reading the biography of Alessandro Bardi (ed. Mai, 593). The general tone is that of a moralist, who shows the dangers of the Renaissance, especially for women, warns against the reading of the novels, and reproaches the Florentines with usury and illicit gains. Vespasiano is a panegyrist of Nicholas V, the great book-lover; he is severe to the point of injustice against Pope Callistus III, the indifferent lender of books, which, however, he did not give over to pillage, as Vespasiano accuses him of doing.

His manuscripts, which he thought of as rough notes for a more polished series of Latin biographies, remained unknown until they were discovered by Cardinal Angelo Mai, who first published them in 1839. A reading of them in Mai's edition in 1847 inspired Jacob Burckhardt to commence his magisterial Civilization of the Renaissance in Italy (1860).

He never married and died in 1498 at the age of 77.

Notes

References
Jacob Burckhardt, Die Cultur der Renaissance, I (3rd ed., Leipzig, 1877), 198, 236-39, 261, 354
Muntz and Fabre, La bibliotheque du Vatican au XV siecle (Paris, 1887), 116
Sandys, A History of Classical Scholarship, II (Cambridge, 1908), 95.

King, Ross (2021), The bookseller of Florence: Vespasiano de Bisticci and the manuscripts that illuminated the Renaissance, Chatto & Windus, London, isbn, 9781784742669.

1421 births
1498 deaths
People from the Province of Florence
Italian biographers
Male biographers
Italian male non-fiction writers
Italian librarians
Italian Renaissance humanists
Italian book publishers (people)